Conehoma Creek is a stream in the U.S. state of Mississippi.

Conehoma Creek is a name derived from the Choctaw language meaning "red polecat", a name which could have been applied to an indigenous warrior.

References

Rivers of Mississippi
Rivers of Attala County, Mississippi
Mississippi placenames of Native American origin